Flying Wild Alaska is a documentary television series that aired on Discovery Channel in 2011 and 2012.

The show features the Tweto family from Unalakleet, Alaska who run the Alaska airline Era Alaska.  They operate the hub operations from Unalakleet. The show also features other segments from their bases in Utqiagvik (Barrow), Deadhorse, and other places.

Cast

Tweto family
 Jim Tweto, the COO of the airline, was born in Wichita, Kansas, but his family moved to Silver Bay, Minnesota shortly after his birth. He then moved to Anchorage, Alaska at the age of 18 with a hockey scholarship at the University of Alaska-Anchorage. Shortly after moving, he realized his true passion was aviation, and in 1980 moved to Unalakleet, Alaska, where he met his wife Ferno. He became the COO of Era when the Frontier Flying Service, Era Aviation, and Hageland Aviation merged in 2009, becoming the largest regional airline in Alaska.
 Ferno Tweto, the Unalakleet station manager and wife of COO Jim Tweto, was born in Anchorage and raised in Unalakleet. Ferno is also a pilot, earning her pilot certificate from a school in Everett, Washington in 1981. Ferno met Jim when he came to Unalakleet in 1980, and they married eight years later in 1988. They have worked together side by side ever since and have three daughters, two of whom are showcased on the show.
 Ariel Tweto is part of the Unalakleet ground crew, and is Jim and Ferno's second child. Like her mother, she ran cross-country and has run every day since 2002.  She was also a contestant on the ABC game show Wipeout in 2008 and 2009. The 2011–2012 season of Flying Wild Alaska depicted Ariel taking flight training to earn her pilot's license. Her instructor, featured in the show, is Chelsea Abingdon Welch.  Ariel received her private pilot certificate on April 21, 2012. Ariel became a frequent guest on The Late Late Show with Craig Ferguson, even joining Ferguson for a time during his week of episodes in Scotland in 2012 and near the end of Ferguson's tenure in December 2014. Tweto has a recurring voice role on the Fox animated sitcom The Great North, playing a teenage girl named Kima Brewper.
 Ayla Tweto, like her sister Ariel, is part of the Unalakleet ground crew. Now living in Anchorage, she is studying to be a paramedic. She visits the rest of her family in Unalakleet every weekend and has her private pilot's certificate.

Others
The show also features other various pilots from cities all around Alaska.

Pamyua has provided background music for Flying Wild Alaska.
Jared Cummings, pilot for Era based out of Kotzebue. Specializing in off-airport landings, he also owns and operates his own company known as the Golden Eagle Outfitters.
Sarah Fraher, pilot based out of St Mary's.
Luke Hickerson, lead pilot and check airman based out of Utqiagvik (Barrow).
Ben Pedersen, pilot based out of Unalakleet.
John Ponts, pilot based out of Utqiagvik (Barrow). He is a former pro skateboarder from San Diego who caught a bug for flying after earning his pilot's license in an attempt to spot empty swimming pools to skate in from the air.
Erik Snuggerud, lead pilot based out of Bethel.
Doug Stewart, pilot based out of Nome.
Nick Stone, co-pilot based out of Nome.
Chelsea Abingdon Welch, flight instructor out of Unalakleet

Episodes

Season 1 (2011)

Season 2 (2011)

Season 3 (2012)

Broadcast Airings
Repeats of the series air on the digital broadcast network Quest.

See also
 Ice Pilots NWT, a similar show based on a bush airline in the Northwest Territories of Canada
 Ice Airport Alaska, a similar show based around Ted Stevens Airport and the airlines that operate out of it
 Arctic Air, a dramatic fiction TV show similar in premise to this documentary TV show

References

External links

2010s American documentary television series
Bush pilots
Discovery Channel original programming
Documentary television series about aviation
Television shows set in Alaska
2011 American television series debuts
2012 American television series endings
Television series about families